Patrizia Tisi (born 17 May 1971) is a former Italian female long-distance runner who competed at four editions of the IAAF World Cross Country Championships at senior level (2001, 2002, 2003, 2004). and two of the IAAF World Half Marathon Championships (2001, 2004).

Biography
She won four national championships at senior level (half marathon: 2004, cross country running: 2003, 2004, 2005).

References

External links
 

1971 births
Living people
Italian female long-distance runners
Italian female cross country runners